Benoitodes is a genus of ground spiders that was first described by Norman I. Platnick in 1993.  it contains only two species: B. caheni and B. sanctaehelenae.

References

Araneomorphae genera
Gnaphosidae
Spiders of Oceania